In 2016, the Southern Kings participated in the 2016 Super Rugby competition, their second appearance in the competition after also playing in 2013.

Chronological list of events

 23 November 2015: SARU announced that an operational implementation task group was set up to oversee the running of the Kings.
 25 November 2015: SARU announced the details of their operational plan for the Kings; the  head coach Deon Davids was named the head coach of the Southern Kings for the 2016 season, with Mzwandile Stick appointed the back coach, Barend Pieterse the forwards coach and Nadus Nieuwoudt the conditioning coach. In addition, a number of consultant coaches from SARU's mobi-unit could also be utilised throughout the season. It was also revealed that a playing squad of 42 players were planned, which would meet all Strategic Transformation Plan guidelines.
 13 December 2015: The names of the first 20 players to sign up for the Kings for 2016 were released. The players were Thembelani Bholi, Tom Botha, Aidon Davis, JP du Plessis, Schalk Ferreira, Louis Fouché, Shane Gates, Siyanda Grey, James Hall, Cornell Hess, Malcolm Jaer, Kevin Luiters, Edgar Marutlulle, Tyler Paul, Junior Pokomela, Steven Sykes, CJ Velleman, Stefan Watermeyer, Elgar Watts and Stefan Willemse. Eastern Province CEO Charl Crous was named the Chief Operating Officer of the Southern Kings.
 4 January 2016: SARU announced that prop Jacobie Adriaanse and lock Schalk Oelofse also joined the Kings for the 2016 Super Rugby season. In addition, Lukhanyo Am, Onke Dubase, Billy Dutton, Leighton Eksteen, Monde Hadebe, Ntando Kebe, Michael Makase, Mihlali Mpafi and Luzuko Vulindlu all joined the training squad on a trial basis.
 8 January 2016: The Kings announced that loose forward Jacques Engelbrecht, who represented the Kings during the 2013 Super Rugby season, would return for the 2016 season.
 22 January 2016: The Kings confirmed that Lukhanyo Am, JC Astle, Chris Cloete, Leighton Eksteen, Martin Ferreira, Tazz Fuzani and Luzuko Vulindlu all joined the Kings for 2016.
 25 January 2016: Three more players were confirmed for the Kings for 2016 – hooker Martin Bezuidenhout, lock Philip du Preez and fullback Jurgen Visser. Another fullback, Jaco van Tonder joined on a trial period.

Personnel

Coaches and management

The Kings coaching and management staff for the 2016 Super Rugby season are:

Squad

The following players were named in the Kings squad for the 2016 Super Rugby season:

Log

Matches

The Kings will play the following matches during the 2016 Super Rugby season:

Player statistics

The Super Rugby appearance record for players that represented the Kings in 2016 is as follows:

See also

 Southern Kings
 2016 Super Rugby season

References

2016 Super Rugby season by team
2016 in South African rugby union
2016